Bergamotenes are a group of isomeric chemical compounds with the molecular formula C15H24.  The bergamotenes are found in a variety of plants, particularly in their essential oils.

There are two structural isomers, α-bergamotene and β-bergamotene, which differ only by the location of a double bond.  Both of these isomers have stereoisomers, the most common of which are known as the cis and trans-isomers (or endo- and exo-isomers).

α-Bergamotene is found in the oils of carrot, bergamot, lime, citron, cottonseed, and kumquat.

Pheromones
The bergamotenes are pheromones for some insects.  For example, β-trans-bergamotene is a pheromone for the wasp Melittobia digitata.  Plants can defend themselves against attack by herbivorous insects by producing pheromones such as bergamotenes that attract predators of those herbivores. In a more complex relationship, the tobacco plant Nicotiana attenuata emits α-trans-bergamotene from its flowers at night to attract the tobacco hawk moth (Manduca sexta) as a pollinator; however, during the day the leaves produce α-trans-bergamotene to lure predatory insects to feed on any larvae and eggs that the pollinator may have produced.

Biosynthesis
All the bergamotenes are biosynthesized from farnesyl pyrophosphate via a variety of enzymes including exo-alpha-bergamotene synthase, (+)-endo-beta-bergamotene synthase, (-)-endo-alpha-bergamotene synthase, and others.  Bergamotenes, in turn, are intermediates in the biosynthesis of more complex chemical compounds.  For example, β-trans-bergamotene is a precursor in the biosynthesis of fumagillin, ovalicin, and related antibiotics.

References

Sesquiterpenes